Bara is a town and a nagar panchayat in Allahabad district in the Indian state of Uttar Pradesh.

See also
Akauni

References

Cities and towns in Allahabad district